Dark Winter may refer to:

 A Dark Winter, a 1998 novel by Dave Luckett
 Operation Dark Winter, a 2001 U.S. bio-terrorist attack simulation
 Dark Winter, a 2001 novel by William Dietrich
 Dark Winter, a 2003 Nick Stone Missions novel by Andy McNab
 Dark Winter, a 2012 novel by David Mark
 Dark Winter, a 2018 novel by Cameron Lisney, first book in the Fateweaver series